Echo Zulu (foaled April 7, 2019) is a champion American Thoroughbred racehorse who won the 2021 Breeders' Cup Juvenile Fillies and 2022 Fair Grounds Oaks, and was named the 2021 Champion Two-Year-Old Filly.

Background
Echo Zulu is a bay filly who was bred in Kentucky by Betz, J. Betz, Burns, CHNNHK, Magers, CoCo Equine, and Ramsby. She is from the first crop of her sire Gun Runner, who was the 2017 American Horse of the Year and winner of the 2017 Breeders' Cup Classic. Echo Zulu is the eleventh foal of racing age out of the stakes-winning mare Letgomyecho, who had previously produced Grade 1 winner Echo Town. She was sold at the 2020 Keeneland Yearling Sale for $300,000 to Winchell Thoroughbreds (which had owned Gun Runner during his racing career) and L and N Racing, which consisted of Lee Levinson, his sons Andy and Michael, and friend Don Nelson. She is trained by Steve Asmussen, who had also trained Gun Runner.

Racing career

2021: Two-year-old season
Echo Zulu made her first start on July 15, 2021 in a maiden special weight race at Saratoga Racecourse. She pressed a fast early pace set by Lady Scarlet, then took the lead at the top of the stretch. She continued to draw away to win by  lengths. She was named a TDN Rising Star by Thoroughbred Daily News.

In her second race, Echo Zulu stepped sharply up in class for the Grade 1 Spinaway Stakes on September 5 at Saratoga. She broke poorly but quickly went to the lead, running the opening quarter-mile in 22.07 seconds and the half in 44.73. She started to draw away turning into the stretch and won by  lengths, becoming the first Grade 1 winner for Gun Runner.

On October 3, Echo Zulu maintained her undefeated record in the Frizette Stakes at Belmont Park. She took the early lead while setting moderately fast fractions, then pulled away in the stretch to win by seven lengths. Asmussen said that he had been worried. "I watched the race from up the stretch, a long ways across to the backside — (and they went) :22 and 1, :45 and change," he said. "But the first thing (jockey Ricardo Santana Jr.) said when he came back was that he couldn't believe how relaxed she was. He said her ears were up and she was relaxed and within herself."

Echo Zulu shipped to California for her final start of the season in the Breeders' Cup Juvenile Fillies on November 5 at Del Mar Racetrack. Asmussen decided to change jockeys to Joel Rosario but the tactics remained the same. Echo Zulu went to the early lead and set moderate fractions, then responded to a brief challenge by pulling away down the stretch to win by  lengths. "She is amazing", said Rosario. "Today she liked what she was doing up there (in the lead) and when I asked her, she just took off."

2022: Three-year-old season 
Echo Zulu was stabled at Fair Grounds Racecourse to prepare for her 2022 campaign. Her trainer Asmussen had two previous Kentucky Oaks winners Summerly and Untappable also wintered at Fair Grounds.

She made her first start as a three-year-old in the Grade II Fair Grounds Oaks which she won by a nose over Hidden Connection. Starting as the very short 1/10 odds-on favorite Echo Zulu bounced out in front and led by a length through the race and barely held on to game Hidden Connection who tried to overtake her on the line.

The 2022 Kentucky Oaks, held on May 6, attracted 'arguably the best field ever' for the race according to The Thoroughbred Daily News. In addition to Secret Oath, the field featured Nest (Ashland Stakes), two-year-old champion Echo Zulu, Kathleen O (Gulfstream Park Oaks), with several well-regarded longshots like Nostalgic (Gazelle Stakes) and Desert Dawn (Santa Anita Oaks). Breaking from post position seven, Echo Zulu pressed on the outside of early leader Yuugirl. In the straight Echo Zulu was in the three path into the lane, made a bid down the lane but weakened late in the drive finishing three lengths behind winner Secret Oath.  After her defeat connections including trainer Steve Asmussen and David Fiske, racing manager for Winchell Thoroughbreds indicated that Echo Zulu would be pointed to the  one-turn mile Grade I Acorn Stakes  Belmont Park and would point to sprint races. 

Echo Zulu was entered to run in the Grade I Acorn Stakes on 11 June but was scratched at the starting gate on veterinarian advice. The track veterinarian gave a clean bill of health, and her connections slowly brought her back to the races.

On September 24 Echo Zulu faced four other fillies in the Grade III Dogwood Stakes at Churchill Downs over seven furlongs. Starting as the 1/2 odds-on favorite Echo Zulu took charge leaving the gate and led every step of the way with splits  of :22.92 and :45.82 enroute to a -length victory. Trainer Steve Asmussen praised her, "We’re just very happy to have her back. She’s extremely talented that we’re unbelievably blessed to be associated with."

StatisticsNotes:'''''

An (*) asterisk after the odds means Echo Zulu was the post-time favourite.

Pedigree

Echo Zulu is inbred 4s × 4d to Storm Cat.

References

2019 racehorse births
Racehorses bred in Kentucky
Racehorses trained in the United States
Thoroughbred family 16-g
Breeders' Cup Juvenile Fillies winners
American Grade 1 Stakes winners